Giovanni Grassi may refer to:

 Giovanni Battista Grassi (1854–1925), Italian physician and zoologist
 Giovanni Antonio Grassi (1775–1849), Italian Jesuit and educator

See also
 Giovanni Grasso, Italian actor
 Giovanni Grasso (judge), Italian judge